Darmiyaan is a 2013 Pakistani television series directed by Shahid Shafaat. It aired on ARY Digital and stars Sania Saeed, Adnan Siddiqui and Syra Yousuf in leading roles. It broadcast in India on Zindagi.

Plot 
The plot of the follows the story of two sisters when the young one seeks out to take revenge from the elder. She tries to manipulate her life after which she not only loses the man of her dreams but also her sense of reality. It revolves around the upside downs in the life of a married couple.

Cast 

 Sania Saeed as Nida
 Adnan Siddiqui as Raheel
 Syra Yousuf as Aliya
 Javeria Abbasi as Farishtay
 Sajida Syed as Raheel's mother
 Kaif Ghaznavi as Nida's friend
 Faisal Naqvi 
 Humaira Ali as Farishtay's mother
 Qaiser Naqvi as Aliya's mother

References

External links 
 

2013 Pakistani television series debuts
2014 Pakistani television series endings
ARY Digital original programming